The 2020 Tercera División play-offs to Segunda División B from Tercera División (Promotion play-offs) were the final playoffs for the promotion from 2019–20 Tercera División to 2020–21 Segunda División B. The first four teams in each group took part in the play-off.

Format
Due to the COVID-19 pandemic, the format was changed to an "express play-off" between the four first qualified teams of each group at the moment of the suspension, without meeting teams from other groups.

Playoffs were played, if possible, in a final four format at neutral venues and depending on the evolution of the pandemic in each region, with spectators or behind closed doors. In case of a draw in any game there were no penalty shootout or overtime; the best-positioned team in the regular season will qualify.

Only one team per group were promoted. The group champions that will not win promotion in the first stage will play an additional playoff to be determined for two more promotions. All teams could have refused to play one another if they wanted. However, there were no withdrawals.

Semifinals were played on 18 and 19 July, and most finals on 25 July.

Qualified teams

Group 1 – Galicia
Playoffs were played at Balaídos, Vigo.

Group 2 – Asturias
Playoffs were played at Román Suárez Puerta, Avilés.

Group 3 – Cantabria
Playoffs were played at Fernando Astorbiza, Sarón, Santa María de Cayón.

Group 4 – Basque Country
Playoffs were played at Sarriena, Leioa. The final was postponed due to a COVID-19 positive case of a person related to a player of Portugalete.

Group 5 – Catalonia
Playoffs were played at Estadio Municipal, Badalona.

Group 6 – Valencian Community
Playoffs were played at Estadio Luis Suñer Picó, Alzira; Estadio El Collao, Alcoy and Estadi Olímpic Camilo Cano, La Nucía.

Group 7 – Community of Madrid
Playoffs were played at Ciudad del Fútbol de Las Rozas, Madrid.

Group 8 – Castile and León
Playoffs were played at Estadio Nueva Balastera, Palencia.

Group 9 – Eastern Andalusia and Melilla
Playoffs were played at Estadio Municipal, Marbella.

Group 10 – Western Andalusia and Ceuta
Playoffs were played at Estadio Municipal, Marbella.

Group 11 – Balearic Islands
Playoffs were played at Estadi Municipal, Santanyí.

Group 12 – Canary Islands
Playoffs were played at Campo Municipal, La Frontera.

Group 13 – Region of Murcia
Playoffs were played at Pinatar Arena, San Pedro del Pinatar.

Group 14 – Extremadura
Semifinals were played at Estadio Romano, Mérida, while the final at Francisco de la Hera, Almendralejo.

Group 15 – Navarre
Playoffs were played at Merkatondoa, Estella-Lizarra.

Group 16 – La Rioja
Playoffs were played at Las Gaunas, Logroño.

Group 17 – Aragon
Playoffs were played at Estadio Pedro Sancho, Zaragoza.

Group 18 – Castilla–La Mancha
Playoffs were played at Manuel Delgado Meco, Alcázar de San Juan.

Repechage
Group champions that did not promote after their stages were eligible to play a new playoff for the two last spots. After the suspension of the Basque Country final, the RFEF agreed to close the competition to four teams, excluding Portugalete in case of losing the final. The two matches were drawn on 28 July.

The two matches would be played at La Ciudad del Fútbol, in Las Rozas de Madrid, at 22:00 CEST. However, the whole repechage was suspended just two hours before the match between Lealtad and Alcoyano due to several positive cases at Marino squad. On 10 August the RFEF granted the promotion of the four teams involved due to the limited availability of dates to play the matches.

|}

Promoted teams

See also
2020 Segunda División play-offs
2020 Segunda División B play-offs

References

External links
Playoffs at Futbolme

2020
play-offs
3